U.S. Route 191 (US-191) is a major , north–south U.S. Numbered Highway through eastern Utah, United States. The present alignment of US-191, which stretches from Mexico to Canada, was created in 1981 through Utah. Previously the route had entered northern Utah, ending at US-91 in Brigham City, but with the completion of I-15 it was truncated to Yellowstone National Park and re-extended on a completely different alignment. In addition to a large portion of US-163, this extension absorbed several state routes: SR-33, most of SR-44, and SR-260.

Route description

US Route 191 enters Utah on Navajo Nation land and crosses mostly desolate parts of the state. The largest cities served by US-191 are Moab, Green River, Price, and Vernal. The highway nears the  level in 2 places in Utah, over Indian Summit near Price and again while crossing the Uintah Mountains near Vernal. It leaves Utah at Flaming Gorge Reservoir. US-191 directly or indirectly serves a number of parks in eastern Utah: Monument Valley Navajo Tribal Park, Glen Canyon National Recreation Area, Hovenweep National Monument, Natural Bridges National Monument, Capitol Reef National Park, Canyonlands National Park, Arches National Park, Dead Horse Point State Park, Utahraptor State Park, Dinosaur National Monument, and Flaming Gorge National Recreation Area.

Three portions of US-191 in Utah have been designated National Scenic Byways. Between U.S. Route 163 and State Route 95, US-191 forms part of the Trail of the Ancients. From Moab to Vernal, US-191 is a portion of the Dinosaur Diamond Prehistoric Highway. The Flaming Gorge-Uintas Scenic Byway begins at Vernal and follows US-191 to Flaming Gorge. The state has designated the portion from Helper to Duchesne as the  Indian Canyon Scenic Byway,  a Utah Scenic Byway.

Three portions of US-191 in Utah have restrictions on trucks and other large vehicles.

The independent portions of US 191 south of Interstate 70, as well as the concurrencies with I-70, US-6, and US-40, are included as part of the National Highway System.

History
When US-191 was created in 1926, it did not enter Utah, only running from Idaho Falls northeast to Yellowstone National Park. An extension in the late 1930s brought US-191 south to Brigham City, Utah, following what was then SR-41 and is now mostly SR-13. With the construction of I-15 parallel to US-191, the latter route was removed from Utah in the early 1970s, and by 1980 it only existed north of Yellowstone.

In cooperation with Montana, Wyoming, and Arizona, the Utah Department of Transportation submitted an application to the American Association of State Highway and Transportation Officials (AASHTO) for an extension of US-191. In Wyoming, it would replace US 187 - a single-state route, which was against current AASHTO policy — and then follow Wyoming Highway 373 to the state line. The portion in Utah replaced several state routes — State Route 260 from Wyoming to Greendale Junction, the majority of SR-44 to US-40 in Vernal, and SR-33 from US-40 in Duchesne to US-6 near Price. After overlapping US-6 past Green River, the routing followed and replaced a large portion of US-163 to a junction southwest of Bluff. Between Bluff and Mexican Water, Arizona, US-191 followed a newly constructed road across the Navajo Nation, and then replaced State Route 63, still mostly inside the reservation, to I-40 at Chambers. (It has since been continued along former US 666 to Douglas on the Mexican border.)

Arizona to US-6

The road from Bluff north via Monticello, Moab, and Valley City to Thompson (a station on the Denver and Rio Grande Railroad) became a state highway in 1910. To connect this road with the rest of the state highway system, a road from Valley City northwest via Floy to Green River was added in 1912, as was a connection from Thompson to via Cisco to Colorado. An extension from Monticello southeast to Colorado was added in 1913, and in the 1920s most of these roadways were assigned numbers: State Route 8 went from Green River via Floy, Valley City, Thompson, and Cisco to Colorado, and State Route 9 began at Valley City and extended south via Moab to Monticello and east to Colorado.

With the creation of the U.S. Highway system in 1926, SR-8 and SR-9 each received a second designation, US-50 and U.S. Route 450 respectively. The state legislature redefined all the state routes in 1927, and moved SR-8 to a direct Floy-Thompson cutoff, with both roads from Valley City to Floy and Thompson becoming SR-9. The Monticello-Bluff road was assigned State Route 47 and extended to Mexican Hat at that time and to the Arizona state line in 1931. The State Road Commission designated a new alignment of SR-9 to Crescent Junction on SR-8 in 1934, replacing both branches to Floy and Thompsons, and the legislature updated the description in 1935; at that time, US-450 was extended from Valley City to Crescent Junction on the new SR-8 (US-50) cutoff.

Although no significant changes were made to SR-9 or SR-47 after 1935, the signed U.S. Highway numbers changed several times. First, in the late 1930s, U.S. Route 160 replaced US-450, continuing to enter the state east of Monticello and end at Crescent Junction. Then in about 1970, US-163 was designated along the entire length of SR-47 from Arizona to Monticello, and replaced US-160 north to Crescent Junction; at the same time, US-666 was extended from Cortez, Colorado over US-160 to a new terminus at US-163 in Monticello.  The 1977 renumbering saw the elimination of SR-9 and SR-47, by then no longer signed due to the concurrent U.S. Highway designations. The final change (except for the 2003 renumbering of US-666 to US-491) came in 1981 when US-191 replaced US-163 north of a junction near Bluff. South of this intersection, US-191 followed a route that did not formerly exist as a state highway. The Bureau of Indian Affairs (BIA) completed this road across the Navajo Nation, and San Juan County built the short piece north of the San Juan River, in time for the extension of US-191. After the BIA granted an easement to Utah for the road, formerly BIA Route N12 (23) 2&3, in 1988, it was added to the state highway system the next year.

US-6 to US-40

The road connecting Colton on SR-8 (US-50, now US-6) with SR-6 (US-40) in Duchesne became a state highway in 1910. The southwest end was moved from Colton to Castle Gate in 1912, and in 1927 it was numbered State Route 33. Few changes were made to the roadway, and in 1981 it became part of US-191.

US-40 to Wyoming

The road from SR-6 (US-40) in Vernal north to SR-43 in Manila, where one could continue to Wyoming, was added to the state highway system in about 1918 as a forest highway project, completed in 1926, and numbered SR-44 in 1927. It was the only state road connecting Daggett County's seat, Manila, with the rest of the state, yet parts remained in an unimproved condition through the 1950s.

Several routes have been designated over the years to connect SR-44 to Flaming Gorge, a canyon on the Green River that lends its name to the Flaming Gorge Dam that US-191 now crosses the river on. The first was  State Route 165, which would have begun at SR-44 south of Manila and headed east to the gorge. The state legislature added the proposed road to the state highway system in 1933, but in 1935 it was deleted, and the number was reused to the west on a portion of Birch Creek Road. Later, in 1941, the planned connection was redesignated as a state highway, this time State Route 220, but in 1945 it was moved north, closer to the state line.

It was this alignment that was actually built, beginning at Linwood on SR-43 and proceeding east-southeasterly through a valley that is now flooded by the Flaming Gorge Reservoir's Linwood Bay. SR-220 was deleted in 1957, but in its place was a new State Route 260 that began at Greendale Junction on SR-44 and headed northeast over the dam (then under construction) and to the state line. The legislature did not specify where it would intersect the border, and the State Road Commission initially routed it along former SR-220 to Linwood. However, the law was amended in 1963 to define the north end to be east of the reservoir, and soon the lake began to fill, cutting off the road to Linwood (and inundating that settlement). By 1981 the new road was completed, and most of SR-44 and all of SR-260 were absorbed by US-191.

Major intersections

See also

 List of U.S. Highways in Utah
 List of state highways in Utah

References

External links

91-1
191
1 in Utah
Transportation in San Juan County, Utah
Transportation in Grand County, Utah
Transportation in Emery County, Utah
Transportation in Carbon County, Utah
Transportation in Duchesne County, Utah
Transportation in Uintah County, Utah
Transportation in Daggett County, Utah